Heat pad may refer to:

 A pad used with surface-mounted components as a heat sink
 Heating pad used to heat parts of the body